State Route 170 (SR 170) is a short,  long state highway located within Grant County in the U.S. state of Washington. The old route ran from the Columbia River southwest of Basin City to SR 17 north of Mesa.

Route description

From SR 17, the highway travels east to cross two pairs of railroad tracks owned by Columbia Basin Railroad, which go south to Connell and north to Moses Lake, to enter Warden. Once the roadway enters Warden, it is named 1st Street and later ends at Main Avenue. The busiest segment of the road in terms of vehicle counts was between SR 17 and Warden, with a daily average of 2,800 motorists in 2007; the busiest segment in 1970 was at Main Avenue, with a daily average of 2,100 motorists.

History

In 1967,  was established on a short route near Warden. The highway became SR 170 in 1970 after it was moved from another route located southwest of Warden. The western railroad crossing was first operated by Northern Pacific Railway while the eastern crossing was operated by the Chicago, Milwaukee, St. Paul and Pacific Railroad in 1963. By 1981, BNSF Railway owned both crossings and as of 2009, the Columbia Basin Railroad operates both.

Major intersections

References

External links

Highways of Washington State

170
Transportation in Grant County, Washington